Ronivaldo is a male given name. Notable people with the name include:

 Ronivaldo Conceição (born 1972), Brazilian squash player
 Ronivaldo (footballer) (born 1989), full name Ronivaldo Bernardo Sales, Brazilian football forward
 Ronivaldo Cruz (born 1995), Cape Verdean football centre-back

Masculine given names